Korambhi  is a village in the Bhandara tahsil of Bhandara District of Maharashtra state in India. There is a temple to the Hindu goddess which is situated on the hill of Korambhi. It is a holy place among Hindus. Korambhi is famous for this Temple. The village is situated on the bank of Wainganga River.

According to the 2011 census it has a population of 659 living in 666 households.

References

Villages in Bhandara district